Félix Sarriugarte Montoya (born 6 November 1964) is a Spanish former professional footballer who played as a forward, currently a manager.

Playing career
Born in Durango, Biscay, Sarriugarte represented Athletic Bilbao for five seasons – having arrived at the San Mamés Stadium at age 16 – but only started featuring regularly for the first team in 1986–87, after a lengthy spell with the reserves where he scored regularly. He then spent another five years in La Liga with Asturias' Real Oviedo, where he was also never relegated (but totalled only three appearances in his last two seasons).

Sarriugarte retired in 1996 at the age of 31 after playing one season with UD Las Palmas and splitting his last year with local Barakaldo CF and UDA Gramenet, with all the sides competing in the lower leagues. In the top flight, he amassed totals of 159 matches and 28 goals; his debut in the latter competition came on 9 September 1984 in a 3–0 away loss against Sevilla FC, due to a strike from the professional footballers.

Coaching career
Sarriugarte took up coaching in the early 2000s, with the various sides of his first club Athletic. On 8 July 2006, following the dismissal of Javier Clemente, he was appointed first-team manager by president Fernando Lamikiz. Just four months later, however, he was relieved of his duties after a 1–3 home defeat to Sevilla which saw them drop into the 18th position, and eventually again barely avoiding relegation.

In June 2009, Sarriugarte signed at CD Varea – soon to be named UD Logroñés – recently promoted to Segunda División B, but stepped down before the campaign began. On 16 July 2012, after having led Sestao River Club to safety in that level, he joined another team in the same tier, Oviedo.

Charlotte Independence announced on 17 January 2019 that Sarriugarte had joined the technical staff of the club as an assistant manager, under Jim McGuinness.

References

External links

1964 births
Living people
People from Durango, Biscay
Spanish footballers
Footballers from the Basque Country (autonomous community)
Association football forwards
La Liga players
Segunda División players
Segunda División B players
Bilbao Athletic footballers
Athletic Bilbao footballers
Real Oviedo players
UD Las Palmas players
Barakaldo CF footballers
UDA Gramenet footballers
Spanish football managers
La Liga managers
Segunda División B managers
Tercera División managers
CD Basconia managers
Athletic Bilbao B managers
Athletic Bilbao managers
Sestao River managers
Real Oviedo managers
Athletic Bilbao non-playing staff
Spanish expatriate sportspeople in the United States